Everything is Shifting is a 2005 EP by Atlanta-based rock band Y-O-U. The record represented a striking change in the band's sound, both lyrically and musically, the latter change being inspired in part by the departure of two members, Eric Park and Matt Sonnicksen, in 2004. Multi-instrumentalist Clay Cook assisted the band in the performance and production of Everything Is Shifting and appeared in the video for "Good Luck with that American Dream"; however, he would not become a member of Y-O-U until after the record's release and would then leave the band before its next project Flashlights. "Good Luck with that American Dream" has been licensed for an international Coca-Cola ad.

Track listing
All songs written by Nick Niespodziani, Peter Olson, and Mark Cobb.

 "Shadows on the Page" - 3:19
 "Not a Dove" - 3:11
 "Good Luck with that American Dream" - 4:05
 "The Change" - 4:24
 "National Straitjacket" - 4:58
 "All Arranged #2" - 3:26
 "Digital Dream" (an electronic remix of "Good Luck with that American Dream") - 4:14

Music videos
"Shadows on the Page"
Dir: Liz Starkey

"Not a Dove"
Dir: Chuck Moore
DP: Pete Wages
Editor: Myron Vasquez
Belly dancer: Jennifer Keselowsky
Feat: Clay Cook

"Good Luck with that American Dream"
Dir: Peter Sobat
Feat: Clay Cook

"National Straitjacket"
Dir: Y-O-U
Feat: Clay Cook
Made entirely in Microsoft PowerPoint

Personnel
Y-O-U: Nicholas Niespodziani, Peter Olson, ?Mark Cobb
Additional Musicianship: Clay Cook
Producers: Y-O-U and Clay Cook
Engineering: Kristofer Sampson, Clay Cook, Peter Olson, Nick Niespodziani
Mixing: Ben H. Allen
Mastering: Alex Lowe
Art Design & Photography: Nick Niespodziani, Peter Olson

References
Deadjournalist interview with Nick Niespodziani

2005 EPs
Y-O-U albums